Julian Wilson Stephenson (September 2, 1883 – November 22, 1964) was an American football, basketball and baseball coach. He served as the head football coach at Jacksonville State Normal School—now known as Jacksonville State University—in Jacksonville, Alabama from 1920 to 1921 and again from 1929 to 1930, compiling a record of 21–9–4. Stephenson was also the head basketball coach at Jacksonville State from 1928 to 1951, and school's head baseball coach from 1948 to 1954.

Stephenson was a student at the University of Alabama. He was also the head football coach at Jacksonville High School in 1928. Stephenson was the brother of Alabama football star and Major League Baseball player Riggs Stephenson. He died on November 22, 1964, at a hospital in Gadsden, Alabama.

Head coaching record

College football

References

External links
 

1883 births
1964 deaths
Basketball coaches from Alabama
Jacksonville State Gamecocks football coaches
Jacksonville State Gamecocks men's basketball coaches
Jacksonville State Gamecocks baseball coaches
High school football coaches in Alabama
Columbia University alumni
University of Alabama alumni